Zythos obliterata is a moth of the family Geometridae described by William Warren in 1897. It is found on Borneo, Peninsular Malaysia and Sumatra. The habitat consists of lowland alluvial forests, secondary forests and dry heath forests.

Adults have uniform dull brownish-pink wings with pale striae.

References

Moths described in 1897
Scopulini